The Continental De Vaux was an automobile produced by the Continental-De Vaux Company in Grand Rapids, Michigan.

In April 1931, De Vaux-Hall Motors started production of an automobile based on the defunct Durant (automobile). Norman de vaux had been an executive with Durant. The car was called the 6/75 and used a 6-cylinder engine that had been modified by renowned engineer Col. Elbert J. Hall, whose company Hall-Scott Motor Car Company of Berkeley, California, had built engines for airplanes, tractors, buses, and boats, and who helped develop the famed World War I Liberty airplane engine with Packard's Jesse Vincent. The company had two plants - one in Grand Rapids and the other in Oakland, California. Poorly capitalized, after only 4808 cars built the company declared bankruptcy in Michigan court, citing $2 million in assets and $1.8 in liabilities, including $487,000 owed to engine maker Continental Motors Company. Continental purchased the Michigan assets of De Vaux-Hall and later changed the operation's name to Continental-De Vaux Company.

Production of the De Vaux Continental (sometimes called vice-verso) took place during the 1932 model year. The car was basically the De Vaux 6/75 of the previous year, that itself was based on the former 1930 Durant (automobile). It rode on a 113 in. wheelbase and still carried the facelift that Count Alexis de Sakhnoffsky did for the De Vaux in 1931. The Hall-modified Continental 22-A 6-cylinder L-head engine was replaced by a Continental 32-A 6-cylinder L-head with a displacement of 214.7 c.i. (3518 ccm), delivering 84 HP @ 3400 rpm. The car now was designated the De Vaux Continental 6/80. Offered were a standard coupe for $725 ($775 with rumble seat), a coupe and a sedan in custom trim for $845 each, and a new custom convertible coupe for $895.
Assembly of the vehicles occurred in the former De Vaux-Hall plant in Grand Rapids (which was connected to their body supplier, the Hayes Body Corporation, by a bridge).

Continental brought out its own cars for the 1933 and 1934 model years, not based on the Durant/De Vaux cars, but sold poorly so ceased production.

De Vaux and De Vaux Continental model comparison 

With 1,358 cars built by November, 1932, the new car was a straightaway failure. Now, Continental dropped the Continental-De Vaux Company and decided to build the car under its own label. Continentals were produced in three series: Beacon (C400) Four, Flyer Six and Ace Six. Each had its own wheelbase (101.5, 107, and 114 in., respectively). Prices started as low as
$355 for a Beacon standard roadster and ended at $845 for the Ace custom sedan. Sixes shared the engine of the former De Vaux Continental 6/80. After another disastrous year with just 3,310 sales in all series, the sixes were dropped for 1934 as were 3 of the 7 bodystyles of the Beacon. Production halted forever in 1934 with 953 Beacons built.

The De Vaux Continental was built in Canada by Dominion Motors as the Frontenac 6/85 as were some Continentals.

References
Bradford, Francis and Ric Dias, Hall-Scott, the Untold Story of a Great American Engine Maker (Warrendale: SAE, Int'l, 2007)
 Kimes, Beverly Rae (editor) and Clark, Henry Austin, jr.,; The Standard Catalogue of American Cars, 2nd Edition, Krause Publications, Iola WI 54990 (1985), 
 Durant Motors Automobile Club (DMAC)
 DeVaux Registry 

Defunct motor vehicle manufacturers of the United States
Durant Motors
Motor vehicle manufacturers based in Michigan
Defunct manufacturing companies based in Michigan
Companies based in Grand Rapids, Michigan